Yuchengxian railway station (literally "Yucheng County railway station") is a station on Longhai railway in Yucheng County, Shangqiu, Henan.

History
The station was established in 1915.

References

Railway stations in Henan
Stations on the Longhai Railway
Railway stations in China opened in 1915